Darius Philon (born January 22, 1994) is an American football defensive tackle who is currently a free agent. He played college football at Arkansas, and selected in the sixth round of the 2015 NFL Draft by the San Diego Chargers.

Professional career

San Diego / Los Angeles Chargers
Philon was drafted by the San Diego Chargers in the sixth round (192nd overall) of the 2015 NFL Draft. On October 17, 2015, he was placed on injured reserve. On December 12, 2015, he was reactivated.

Arizona Cardinals
On March 21, 2019, Philon signed a two-year contract with the Arizona Cardinals. On August 10, 2019, he was released by the team following his arrest for an assault with a deadly weapon.

Las Vegas Raiders
Philon signed with the Las Vegas Raiders on March 22, 2021. He played in six games before being placed on injured reserve on November 10, but rejoined the active roster on December 11. He suffered a torn patellar tendon in Week 18 and was placed on injured reserve on January 11, 2022.

References

External links
Arkansas Razorbacks bio

1994 births
Living people
Players of American football from Alabama
Sportspeople from Mobile, Alabama
American football defensive tackles
Arkansas Razorbacks football players
San Diego Chargers players
Los Angeles Chargers players
Arizona Cardinals players
Las Vegas Raiders players